ZUS may refer to:

 Social Insurance Institution, Zakład Ubezpieczeń Społecznych, Polish state social insurance agency
Zone urbaine sensible (Sensitive urban zone), urban area in France defined to be a high-priority target for city policy